Caladenia pumila, commonly known as the dwarf spider orchid is a plant in the orchid family Orchidaceae and is endemic to Victoria, Australia. It is a ground orchid with a single erect, hairy leaf and a single white flower with pale pink stripes. Its short flowering stem distinguishes it from other Victorian spider orchids. After 1933 it was presumed extinct until two plants were discovered in 2009.

Description
The sides of the labellum sometimes have a few short teeth and the tip curls under. There are four or six rows of well-spaced pink calli along the mid-line of the labellum. Flowering occurs in September to October.

Taxonomy and naming
Caladenia pumila was first formally described in 1922 by R.S.Rogers and the description was published in Transactions and Proceedings of the Royal Society of South Australia. The specific epithet (pumila) is a Latin word meaning "dwarfish" or "little".

Distribution and habitat
The dwarf spider orchid has only been recorded from grassy woodland near Bannockburn and is only known from two plants.

Conservation
Caladenia pumila is listed as "Endangered" under the Victorian Government Flora and Fauna Guarantee Act 1988 and as "Critically Endangered" under the Commonwealth Government Environment Protection and Biodiversity Conservation Act 1999 (EPBC) Act. After the orchid was first described in 1922, numbers declined until only two specimens were known in 1933. There were no records of the species from then and the species was presumed extinct. In 2009, two specimens were found in a nature conservation reserve. Efforts are being made to increase numbers. The main threats to the species are habitat degradation, trampling, competition with other species and a lack of genetic diversity.

References

pumila
Plants described in 1922
Endemic orchids of Australia
Orchids of Victoria (Australia)